Johann Liebenberger (27 October 1930 – 17 February 2002) was an Austrian water polo player. He competed in the men's tournament at the 1952 Summer Olympics.

References

External links
 

1930 births
2002 deaths
Austrian male water polo players
Olympic water polo players of Austria
Water polo players at the 1952 Summer Olympics
Place of birth missing